Marxist–Leninist Group was a communist party in Burkina Faso. It was founded in November 1983 as split from the Voltaic Revolutionary Communist Party. In August 1984 it was among the founders of the Union of Burkinabè Communists.

Political parties established in 1983
Communist parties in Burkina Faso
Defunct political parties in Burkina Faso